The Canada Men's National Football Team represent Canada in Senior Men's international gridiron football competitions. It is governed and managed by Football Canada and is recognized by the International Federation of American Football (IFAF). Football Canada is the governing body for amateur Canadian football, however, IFAF-sponsored games are played using American football rules. They competed for their first and only IFAF World Championship in 2011.

There are currently no plans for Canada to field a senior men's team for the 2023 World Championships in Germany. 

Since the 2011 senior event, Canada's flagship men's tackle program is the Canada national football junior team, an elite U20 developmental program that participates in the International Federation of American Football (IFAF) Under-19 World Championship, which was a biennial championship until 2020, then moved to a quadrennial event. The next IFAF World Junior Football Tournament is scheduled for Edmonton, Alberta in July 2024. Canada is the most successful team at the WJFC. They won the 2012 Under-19 championship, upsetting the favourite and host team, the United States, to give the US national team its first loss to date in international competition. They won the 2016 championship in China, then defended their championship with a 2018 title in Mexico. The 2020 tournament was canceled due to the COVID-19 Pandemic.

History
Football Canada became a full member of the IFAF in 2004. Thereafter Canada competed in international junior, flag, and women's football events. In 2011 it was announced that Canada would organize a senior men's team for international competition. They made their international debut at the 2011 IFAF World Cup. The team's head coach was Larry Haylor, the former head coach of the University of Western Ontario Mustangs who retired from the program as the winningest coach in the history of USPORTS football.

Unlike the US national team, active professional players are allowed to participate, and a handful of Canadian Football League players participated on the national squad, although the fact that the CFL's season overlapped with the 2011 World Championship prevented most of the best non-import players in that league from participating.

IFAF World Championship record

References

 
Men's national American football teams
Gridiron football
American football in Canada
American football teams in Canada
2011 establishments in Canada
American football teams established in 2011